The Asian Open is a defunct WTA Tour affiliated women's tennis tournament played from 1992 to 1994. It was held at the Amagasaki Memorial Sports Centre in Osaka in Japan and was played on indoor carpet courts.

Past finals

Singles

Doubles

References
 WTA Results Archive

 
Carpet court tennis tournaments
Indoor tennis tournaments
Defunct tennis tournaments in Japan
WTA Tour
Recurring sporting events established in 1992
Recurring events disestablished in 1994